Old Zion Methodist Church is a historic church at Park City, Kentucky.

It was built in 1856 and added to the National Register of Historic Places in 1983.

References

Methodist churches in Kentucky
Churches on the National Register of Historic Places in Kentucky
Churches completed in 1856
19th-century Methodist church buildings in the United States
National Register of Historic Places in Barren County, Kentucky
1856 establishments in Kentucky